The N76 road is a national secondary road in Ireland.

The N76 is one of the oldest roads in Ireland. Between its start point east of Clonmel and its old route through Kilkenny, the N76 once formed an integral part of the T6 - the old trunk road that connected the cities of Cork and Dublin before the contemporary numbering system was established. It was mapped as such in Herman Moll's 1714 map of Ireland.

See also
Roads in Ireland 
Motorways in Ireland
National primary road
Regional road

References

Roads Act 1993 (Classification of National Roads) Order 2006 – Department of Transport

National secondary roads in the Republic of Ireland
Roads in County Kilkenny
Roads in County Tipperary